Hippi is a 2019 Indian Telugu-language romantic action comedy film written and directed by T. N. Krishna and produced by V Creations and Asian Cinemas. The film stars Kartikeya, Digangana Suryavanshi, and J. D. Chakravarthy. The principal photography commenced in November 2018 and the film was released on 6 June 2019.

Plot 
The plot revolves around two people who fall in love and lust but are overpowered by their egos, one thing leads to another and to prove his manliness the guy forces himself on the girl, which ends up consensual. The film ends with the couple having sex for the rest of the time.

Cast 

Karthikeya as Devdas Nadimpalli aka Hippi
Digangana Suryavanshi as Aamukthamaalyadha
J. D. Chakravarthy as Hippi's boss and mentor
Brahmaji as Hippi's brother-in-law
Md Asif as MMA coach as a guest appearance
Jazba Singh as Sneha, Hippi's first girlfriend
Vennela Kishore as Harley Davidson aka HD
Hari Teja as a maid
Fish Venkat as a drunkard
Shraddha Das in a cameo appearance

Production 
Following the box office success of the RX 100 which was released in May 2018, the lead actor received many call sheets from new directors as the actor revealed that he was confused about choosing the correct scripts to pursue his acting career. Krishna who is known for his works in Tamil cinema decided to cast Kartikeya in the lead role in order to make a Telugu film.

The shooting of the film commenced on 9 November 2018, soon after the launching ceremony of the film in Hyderabad. The few portions of the film were shot in Hyderabad before the filmmakers paving the way to shoot most of the portions of the film in Chennai. The remaining portions of the film are being shot in Sri Lanka.

Soundtrack 
The soundtrack was composed by Nivas K. Prasanna in his Telugu debut.

Release 
Hippi was released on 6 June 2019.

References

External links 

2010s Telugu-language films
Indian action comedy films
Indian romantic action films
Films shot in Chennai
Films shot in Sri Lanka
Films shot in Hyderabad, India
Films scored by Nivas K. Prasanna
2019 films
2019 action comedy films
2010s romantic action films
2019 romantic comedy films